Mr Lucky is a retrospective album by Pete Thomas.

It was officially released on 12 March 2007, but was available to purchase on 25 October 2006 at his website.

Track listing

"Stick It To 'Em" - 03:48 - Theme music from Monkey Business (TV series)
"Voodoo Chill" - 03:42
"Letters From Paris" - 03:17 - Features the Electra String Quartet
"Jazzbo In The Jungle" - 03:17
"The Organisation" - 03:33 - Commission for a Dry Blackthorn Cider commercial
"Cookin' with Lee" - 02:56 - Features Lee Allen on tenor sax
"Another Night In The Naked City" - 04:09 - Originally featured in a Tenants Pilsner commercial
"Tang" - 02:58 
"Mr Lucky's Gumbo" - 03:29
"Laid Back And Blue" - 03:32
"Bodacity" - 03:00 - Originally featured in the Michael Caine movie Blue Ice
"Ooh Ah Ooh" - 02:56 - Featured on Nick Jr. (UK)
"Catch 23" - 03:58 - Originally commissioned for a biopic feature film about George Best
"One For Tiny" - 02:52 - Features Lee Allen with a tenor sax solo
"Hard Hat Area" - 04:20
"Mango Banana" - 02:53

Musicians

 Pete Thomas – saxophone, flute, guitar
 Guy Barker – trumpet
 Evan Jolly – trumpet
 Bob Tinker – trumpet
 Ashley Slater – trombone
 Annie Whitehead – trombone
 Lee Allen – tenor saxophone
 Frank Dawkins – guitar
 Dave Marchant – guitar
 Chris Pearce – guitar
 Ben Waters – piano
 Geraint Watkins – piano
 Pete Wingfield – piano, organ
 Anthony Kerr – vibraphone
 Malcolm Creese – double bass
 Steve Rose – double bass
 Paul Riley – bass guitar
 Roy Dodds – drums
 Paul Robinson – drums
 Mark Townson – congas

Bonus material

The CD contains a computer-readable data portion featuring:

 All audio tracks in computer file format, ready for an MP3 player
 The full-length version of the video of audio track 2 - Voodoo Chill

Video
The Voodoo Chill video was filmed at 

Shepperton Studios in Middlesex
Poland Street car park, Soho
The Diorama
The Sea Life Centre in Weymouth
The River Itchen, Hampshire.

The saxophone on the video is a tenor, whereas the saxophone being played is a baritone. Also featuring Chris Pearce on guitar.

References

External links
Pete Thomas' website
Chris Pearce's website
Youtube - Preview of Voodoo Chill

2007 compilation albums